Microdiplodia is a genus of fungi belonging to the family Botryosphaeriaceae.

The genus has almost cosmopolitan distribution.

Species

Species:
 Microdiplodia abiegna 
 Microdiplodia abramovii 
 Microdiplodia abutilonis

References

Fungi